Ferdinando may refer to:

Politics
 Ferdinando I de' Medici, Grand Duke of Tuscany (1549–1609)
 Ferdinando II de' Medici, Grand Duke of Tuscany (1610–1670)
 Ferdinando de' Medici, Grand Prince of Tuscany (1663–1713), eldest son of Cosimo III de' Medici
 Ferdinando Gonzaga, Duke of Mantua (1587–1626)
 Ferdinando Carlo Gonzaga, Duke of Mantua and Montferrat (1652–1708), only child of Duke Charles II of Mantua
 Ferdinando Fairfax, 2nd Lord Fairfax of Cameron (1584–1648), English politician and parliamentary general

Sports
 Ferdinando De Giorgi (born 1961), Italian volleyball player and coach
 Ferdinando Meglio (born 1959), Italian fencer
 Ferdinando Piani, Italian bobsledder

Other
 Ferdinando Galli-Bibiena (1656–1743), Italian architect and painter
 Ferdinando Galiani (1728–1787), Italian economist during the Enlightenment
 Ferdinando Piretti, an Italian mathematician
 Ferdinando Sardella, a Swedish scholar of the history of religion
 Ferdinando Eboli, a Gothic tale written by Mary Shelley

See also 
 Ferdinand (disambiguation)
 Fernand (disambiguation)
 Fernando (disambiguation)

Italian masculine given names